HMS Elgin was a Hunt-class minesweeper of the Aberdare sub-class built for the Royal Navy during World War I. She was not finished in time to participate in the First World War. A mine badly damaged her in 1944; she was sold for scrap in 1945.

Design and description
The Aberdare sub-class were enlarged versions of the original Hunt-class ships and carried more powerful armament. The ships displaced  at normal load. The ships' complement consisted of 74 officers and ratings.

The ships had two vertical triple-expansion steam engines, each driving one shaft, using steam provided by two Yarrow boilers.

The Aberdare sub-class was armed with a quick-firing (QF)  gun forward of the bridge and a QF twelve-pounder (76.2 mm) anti-aircraft gun aft. Some ships were fitted with six- or three-pounder guns in lieu of the twelve-pounder.

Construction and career
HMS Elgin was built by the William Simons & Company at their shipyard in Renfrew. She was originally to be named Troon, but was renamed before launch to avoid possible misunderstandings of having vessels named after coastal locations. On 4 May 1944, Elgin was nine miles east of the Isle of Portland, when she triggered an acoustic mine that damaged her severely. She was towed to Portsmouth where she was scrapped in 1945.

See also
Elgin, Moray, Scotland

Notes

References
 
 
 

 

Hunt-class minesweepers (1916)
1919 ships
Maritime incidents in May 1944